Sean Michael Daley (born September 7, 1972), better known by his stage name Slug, is an American rapper from Minneapolis, Minnesota. Slug is best known as one half of the hip hop group Atmosphere, which he founded with Derek Turner (Spawn).  Turner has since left and Anthony Davis (Ant) produces Atmosphere with Slug. In 1995, Slug, in collaboration with Anthony Davis, Musab Saad, and Brent Sayers founded the Minneapolis-based independent hip hop record label Rhymesayers Entertainment.

Biography
Slug was born Sean Michael Daley in Minneapolis, Minnesota, on September 7, 1972. The son of Valerie and Craig Daley, he is of Irish, Norwegian, African-American, and Native American descent. Slug's nickname comes from his father's; his dad was known to his friends as "Sluggo" and thus they began to call Sean "little Sluggo," which he shortened to "Slug". In Atmosphere's early years, Slug DJ'd behind the scenes and let Spawn handle lyrics. The group eventually formed a strong relationship with Ant (Anthony Davis) and began collaborating on music. Along with solo MC Musab (then Beyond), and groups Black hole, Phull Surkle, and the Abstract Pack they formed the mid-1990s crew Headshots, with Slug appearing on the underground tape series HeadShots (1-7).

Another notable project of Slug's is Felt, a collaboration with his friend, another underground rapper, MURS.  Other projects he has been a part of include The Dynospectrum, in which he was known as "Sep Se7en", and Deep Puddle Dynamics. He is a member of a loose collective known as The Orphanage, along with Aesop Rock, Illogic, Eyedea and Blueprint.

In 2005, Slug and MURS started up Women Records, a record label through which they would release the albums of rock bands that they were friends with. The label was set up as an imprint through Rhymesayers Entertainment.

Lyrical themes
A prominent theme in lyrics is his allegorical usage of women, especially in his earlier work.  A notable use of women by Slug is in the song "Woman with the Tattooed Hands", which Slug has said is "a metaphor for that same stuff that everybody has already made songs about". Further uses come in the form of the song "Abusing of the Rib" from Headshots: SE7EN: it has been said that the "lover" that Slug speaks of is actually an allegory for a girlfriend addicted to heroin.

A character Slug refers to as "Lucy", who has been purported to symbolize a range of different entities, is the most notable of these allegories. In earlier Atmosphere songs, it is believed that Slug used Lucy as a means of writing about ex-girlfriends. Lucy became so prominent that Atmosphere's 2001 album bore her name, Lucy Ford: The Atmosphere EPs, with the record itself concentrating fairly heavily on women and relationships, in songs such as "Don't Ever Fucking Question That" and "Mama Had A Baby And His Head Popped Off". Slug himself has since said of Lucy that he originally believed "her" to be a representation of the dichotomy between himself and women. He acknowledges now that Lucy became a demonization ("Lucy Ford" being a play on words for Lucifer) of himself and his dependency on alcohol, drugs, sex and validation.

Slug raps in an introspective style, as seen on the song "Little Man", in which he confronts the complaints that people have about him by looking at his relationship with his father and son. This introspective style has become less prevalent as of Atmosphere's 2008 album When Life Gives You Lemons, You Paint That Shit Gold in which Slug navigates through other people's lives. Slug has stated that in and around the year of 2005, he began to move in a new direction lyrically as he became more aware of the effect his lyrics would have on kids, especially his own son who was becoming a teenager at the time.

Slug also dislikes some of the songs that he wrote before and does not perform them live, such as "Vampires" from 2002 album God Loves Ugly. Daley has stated: "[...] when I did get my phase of trying to figure myself out, there was a lot of tug-of-war inside of me between wanting to hate a particular woman and then feeling guilty about that. And there’s certain songs that I won’t perform anymore, because the game of tug-of-war is over and I know where I’m at. Furthermore, Slug has criticised Atmosphere's debut album Overcast! saying: "It's obvious that I’m trying so fucking hard on Overcast and you can see through it and tell it's not a person it's more of an attempt at trying to fill the niche, it was like I was trying to prove to myself that I was a rapper."

Discography

Atmosphere

Studio albums
Overcast! (1997)
God Loves Ugly (2002)
Seven's Travels (2003)
You Can't Imagine How Much Fun We're Having (2005)
When Life Gives You Lemons, You Paint That Shit Gold (2008)
The Family Sign (2011)
Southsiders (2014)
Fishing Blues (2016)
Mi Vida Local (2018)
Whenever (2019)
The Day Before Halloween (2020)
WORD? (2021)

EPs
Overcast! EP (1997)
Ford One (2000)
Ford Two (2000)
Sad Clown Bad Dub II (2000)
Lucy Ford: The Atmosphere EPs (2001)
Happy Clown Bad Dub 8/Fun EP (2006)
Sad Clown Bad Summer 9 (2007)
Sad Clown Bad Fall 10 (2007)
Sad Clown Bad Winter 11 (2007)
Sad Clown Bad Spring 12 (2008)
Leak at Will (2009)
To All My Friends, Blood Makes the Blade Holy: The Atmosphere EPs (2010)

Felt
Felt: A Tribute to Christina Ricci (2002)
Felt, Vol. 2: A Tribute to Lisa Bonet (2005)
Felt 3: A Tribute to Rosie Perez (2009)
Felt 4 U (2020)

Deep Puddle Dynamics
The Taste of Rain... Why Kneel? (1999)

Dynospectrum
Dynospectrum (1998)

Musical collaborations

References

External links

 Interview at britishhiphop.co.uk, June 2008
 Interview at ViralFashion.com, September 2012

1972 births
American male rappers
Living people
Rappers from Minneapolis
American people who self-identify as being of Native American descent
Alternative hip hop musicians
American people of Irish descent
American people of Norwegian descent
Midwest hip hop musicians
Songwriters from Minnesota
Underground rappers
21st-century American rappers
Rhymesayers Entertainment artists
Rhymesayers Entertainment
21st-century American male musicians
American male songwriters